Brian Ernest Talbot (born 21 July 1953) is an English former football player and manager. He was capped six times for the England national team.

Talbot played in midfield for Ipswich Town, Arsenal, Watford, Stoke City, West Bromwich Albion, Fulham and Aldershot of the Football League, for non-league club Sudbury Town, and for the Toronto Metros of the North American Soccer League. He then went into management with West Bromwich Albion, Aldershot, Rushden & Diamonds, Oldham Athletic, Oxford United, and two Maltese clubs, Hibernians and Marsaxlokk.

Between 1984 and 1988, Talbot was chairman of the Professional Footballers' Association.

Club career
A midfielder, Talbot began his football apprenticeship with Ipswich Town in 1968, during which he spent two seasons on loan with Canadian club Toronto Metros of the North American Soccer League,  turning professional in 1972. He made 227 appearances for Ipswich, and won the 1977–78 FA Cup with the club. In the semi-final against West Bromwich Albion, Talbot scored the first goal after seven minutes, but was injured in the act of scoring when he collided head-to-head with Albion's skipper, John Wile. Wile played with a bandaged head for the remainder of the contest while Talbot needed three stitches in a cut above the eye and was unable to continue. In 2013, Talbot was inducted into the Ipswich Town F.C. Hall of Fame.

In January 1979, Talbot moved to Arsenal for a fee of £450,000. He went straight into the first team and played for the Gunners in that year's FA Cup final, scoring in a 3–2 victory over Manchester United, the first player for more than 100 years to win the FA Cup with two different teams in consecutive seasons. The following year he set a club record, as an ever-present in Arsenal's marathon 70-match 1979–80 season; the club reached the finals of both the FA Cup and the European Cup Winners' Cup, but lost them both.

Because of his stamina and fitness, Talbot missed "at most, a handful" of Arsenal's first-team matches. In all, he played 327 first-team matches for the Gunners, scoring 49 goals, and was voted in at number 23 in a 2016 poll of Arsenal's greatest 50 players.

He left Arsenal in June 1985, spending a season and a half at Watford before joining his old Ipswich Town teammate Mick Mills at Stoke City in October 1986, where he helped the Potters climb the table only to fall six points short of a play-off place. During the 1987–88 he made 27 appearances before he left in January 1988 for West Bromwich. Talbot played three years for the Baggies, mostly as player-manager, ending his Football League career with brief spells at Fulham in March 1991, then with Aldershot, and finally with Sudbury Town of the Eastern Counties League.

International career
Talbot played as an over-age player in England's first match at under-21 level, a goalless friendly with Wales in December 1976. He made his senior debut on 28 May 1977, as a second-half substitute in a 2–1 win against Northern Ireland in the 1976–77 British Home Championship, and his first start on 4 June in the same competition against Scotland at Wembley. He started England's next three matches, on a South American tour later in June. Between 1978 and 1980, he played eight matches for England B, scoring three goals, and made his sixth and final senior appearancethe only one he made as an Arsenal playerin May 1980 against Australia in Sydney.

Managerial career
Talbot's managerial debut came with West Bromwich Albion, where he served as player-manager from February 1989 to January 1991. His tenure started well, with the side challenging for promotion. But a collapse during the final weeks of the 1988–89 season meant they failed even to qualify for the playoffs. The following season saw the team only narrowly survive in the Second Division, and the struggle continued into the 1990–91 season. Talbot was dismissed by Albion after a 4–2 FA Cup defeat at the hands of non-league Woking; the team ended the season with relegation to the Third Division for the first time ever. After leaving Albion, he joined Fulham and played five times in the Third Division, scoring once, before being appointed player-manager of Fourth Division strugglers Aldershot, who were deep in debt. After a dismal start to the 1991–92 season, Talbot left the Shots in November 1991 and was succeeded by Ian McDonald; four months later the club went bust and were forced out of the Football League. Talbot then led Maltese Premier League club Hibernians to the league title in 1993 and 1994.

He returned to English club football as part of the coaching staff of Rushden and Diamonds, then in the Football Conference, in 1997. After a spell as head coach he was appointed club manager before the start of the 1999–2000 season. At the end of the 2000–01 season Rushden secured promotion to the Football League under his management. The team reached the Division Three playoffs in 2002 but lost in the final. In their second season in the League they secured the 2002–03 Division Three title, but were relegated the following season, Talbot having left the club in March 2004 after seven years to take over at Oldham Athletic.

Talbot succeeded in keeping Oldham in Division Two in 2004, then the following season he took them into the third round of the FA Cup, in which the Latics produced a shock result to beat local Premier League team Manchester City 1–0 thanks to a goal from Scott Vernon. But results in the League were not the same: following a defeat to Bolton Wanderers, the team went on a seven-match losing streak which led to Talbot's departure by mutual consent on 24 February 2005 following a 5–1 defeat at Bristol City. He signed a two-year contract as manager of Oxford United before the final game of the 2004–05 season. After an unsuccessful stint in charge, Talbot was sacked in mid-March 2006 with the team 22nd in League Two, having not won since 2 January and destined to lose their League status at the end of the season.

Talbot made a quick return to management in Malta with Marsaxlokk, and guided them to the domestic league title and a place in the UEFA Champions League. Following a disappointing start to the 2008–09 Maltese Premier League season, Marsaxlokk appointed former Msida Saint-Joseph manager Patrick Curmi as the club's new head coach on 17 December 2008. Talbot remained with the club until early 2011 in the role of technical director.

In February 2011, he joined English Premier League club Fulham as European scout. He was promoted to chief scout and assistant director of football operations in February 2017.

Personal life
Talbot has a son, Daniel Talbot, who is also a footballer.

Career statistics

As a player
Source:

A.  The "Other" column constitutes appearances and goals in the FA Charity Shield, Football League Trophy, UEFA Cup and UEFA Cup Winners' Cup.

International
Source:

As a manager

Honours

As a player
Ipswich Town
 FA Cup: 1978
Arsenal
 FA Cup: 1979
 FA Cup runner-up: 1980
 European Cup Winners' Cup runner-up: 1980

Individual
Football League First Division PFA Team of the Year: 1976–77
Ipswich Town F.C. Hall of Fame: 2013

As a manager
Hibernians
 Maltese Premier League: 1993–94, 1994–95
Rushden & Diamonds
 Football Conference: 2000–01
 Football League Third Division: 2002–03
 Marsaxlokk
 Maltese Premier League: 2006–07

Individual
League Two Manager of the Month: November 2002, March 2003

References

External links
 
 

1953 births
Living people
Sportspeople from Ipswich
English footballers
English expatriate footballers
England B international footballers
England under-21 international footballers
England international footballers
Association football midfielders
Ipswich Town F.C. players
Toronto Blizzard (1971–1984) players
Arsenal F.C. players
Watford F.C. players
Stoke City F.C. players
West Bromwich Albion F.C. players
Fulham F.C. players
Aldershot F.C. players
Sudbury Town F.C. players
North American Soccer League (1968–1984) players
English Football League players
English football managers
English expatriate football managers
West Bromwich Albion F.C. managers
Aldershot F.C. managers
Rushden & Diamonds F.C. managers
Oldham Athletic A.F.C. managers
Oxford United F.C. managers
Marsaxlokk F.C. managers
English Football League managers
Expatriate soccer players in Canada
English expatriate sportspeople in Canada
English expatriate sportspeople in Malta
Fulham F.C. non-playing staff
FA Cup Final players
Association football scouts